The Yatay Medal was an Uruguayan military decoration granted by the Uruguayan government to honor the Uruguayan allied forces who participated in the Battle of Yatay, part of the Paraguayan War.

Characteristics 
It was minted by Juan Welker in Montevideo. The oval-shaped medal is of 34 by 28.5 millimeters (with a variant of 33.5 by 28.5 millimeters), on whose obverse it depicts the text "Vencedores del Yatay" ("Victorious in Yatay") and on its reverse the text "17 de Agosto de 1865" ("17 August 1865"), trimmed around it with two branches of laurel. It was coined in gold for Chiefs, in silver for Officers and in copper for the troop.

The medal hangs from a white and sky-blue ribbon, and it was placed on the chest. This decoration also was granted along with a diploma.

Ranks 
The decoration had three ranks:
 Chiefs, in gold
 Officers, in silver
 the Troop, in copper

See also 

 Orders, decorations, and medals of Uruguay

References

External links 
 

Military decorations and medals of Uruguay
Paraguayan War
1865 in Uruguay
Awards established in 1865
1865 establishments in Uruguay